Children's Grand Park is a park complex in Choeup-dong, Busanjin-gu, Busan, South Korea. Facilities at the Children's Grand Park include hills and hiking trails, Zoo, gardens, a lake and streams, observation tower and an amusement park.

Public Transportation
Busan Metro Line 1 or Busan Metro Line 2, Seomyeon Station (Exit 2) → Bus 63, 81, 83-1, 133, 54 → Children’s Park

See also
 Busan Citizens Park

References

External links
 Children's Grand Park website (Korean only)
 Dynamic Busan website
 Visit Korea website

Amusement parks in South Korea
Parks in Busan